Message to Man International Film Festival (Poslaniye k Chelovyeku) is an international competitive documentary, short and animated film festival held annually in Saint Petersburg, Russia.

Message to Man originated in the USSR in 1988 as a biennale documentary film festival. Since 1994 it has been held annually in September, and has included short and animated films.

Since 2007, video and digital films have been included in the festival.

In 2010, Alexey Uchitel became president of the film festival, and Mikhail Litvyakov is an honorary president.

In reaction to the 2022 Russian invasion of Ukraine, the FIAPF (International Federation of Film Producers Associations) paused the accreditation of the Message to Man International Film Festival, along with the Moscow International Film Festival, until further notice.

References

External links
 

Animation film festivals
Culture in Saint Petersburg
Documentary film festivals in Russia
Film festivals established in 1988
1988 establishments in Russia
Film festivals in Russia
Short film festivals